The Uzbekistan Futsal League, is the top league for Futsal in Uzbekistan. The winning team obtains the participation right to the AFC Futsal Club Championship.

Champions

Men

Women
 2005:Sevinch Qarshi
 2006:Sevinch Qarshi
 2007:Sevinch Qarshi
 2008:Sevinch Qarshi  Andijanka Andijan   Stroitel Zarafshan
 2009:
 2010:
 2011:Sevinch Qarshi Olimpia Qarshi Andijanka Andijan

External links
 Uzbekistan Futsal League (Russian)
 Champions of Futsal Uzbekistan

Top level futsal leagues in Asia
Futsal in Uzbekistan
futsal
Sports leagues established in 1996
1996 establishments in Uzbekistan